The BVA Cup (Balkan Volleyball Association Cup) is a volleyball competition contested by the respective national volleyball championship winning teams of nations in the Balkans. The tournament was founded in 2008 under the auspices of the Balkan Volleyball Association. The founders of the Balkan Volleyball Association are the volleyball federations of Bulgaria, Albania, Turkey, Greece, Serbia, North Macedonia, Croatia, and Romania. The winners of the BVA Cup get the right to play in the CEV Challenge Cup. The tournament is held in September.

Winners (men)

Winners (women)

References

External links 
Official website:
 http://www.balkanvolleyball.org 

Other websites:
 http://www.worldofvolley.com/championships/competition/651/bva-cup-2012-.html
 http://www.worldofvolley.com/championships/competition/2578/bva-cup-2013.html
 http://www.balkanvolleyball.org/thenews/undefeated-besiktas-qualifies-for-cev-challenge-cup-women.html

European volleyball club competitions
Sport in the Balkans
Recurring sporting events established in 2008
2008 establishments in Europe